Zdravko Popović (born 2 January 1983) is a Croatian former football player who played as forward.

Club career

Popović joined AEK Athens in the summer of 2013, signing a 2-year contract, after playing for Simurq PFC in Azerbaijan Premier League.

His former clubs include NK Zagreb, NK Croatia Sesvete, OFI Crete and Levadiakos. He led Croatia Sesvete in goal-scoring in both of his seasons with the club, notching a total of 51 goals.

Career statistics

Honours

AEK Athens
Football League 2: 2013–14 (6th Group)

References

External links
 
Profile at 1hnl.net
Guardian's Stats Centre
Profile at epae.org

1983 births
Living people
Footballers from Zagreb
Association football forwards
Croatian footballers
NK Zagreb players
NK Samobor players
NK Croatia Sesvete players
OFI Crete F.C. players
Atromitos F.C. players
Levadiakos F.C. players
Simurq PIK players
AEK Athens F.C. players
Balmazújvárosi FC players
Apollon Pontou FC players
GAS Ialysos 1948 F.C. players
Marko F.C. players
Croatian Football League players
Super League Greece players
Football League (Greece) players
Azerbaijan Premier League players
Nemzeti Bajnokság II players
Croatian expatriate footballers
Expatriate footballers in Greece
Croatian expatriate sportspeople in Greece
Expatriate footballers in Azerbaijan
Croatian expatriate sportspeople in Azerbaijan
Expatriate footballers in Hungary
Croatian expatriate sportspeople in Hungary